Kuchar is a village in Alborz County, Qazvin Province, Iran. It may also refer to:

Kuchař (surname), a surname of Czech and Slovak-language origin
Kukhar (surname), a Ukrainian surname, sometimes transliterated as Kuchar
Kuchar (surname), a surname of Slavic origin